The Austrian Research Promotion Agency ( or FFG) is an organization for the promotion of research and innovation in the field of applied and industrial research in Austria and is 100% owned by the Republic of Austria . The aim is to strengthen the business location Austria through targeted programs, especially in research and development. The ownership is represented by the federal government through the Federal Ministry for Transport, Innovation and Technology and the Federal Ministry of Economics and Labour.

History and Organization

The Austrian Research Promotion Agency was founded in September 2004  as "the central Austrian organisation for promotion of research and innovation". It was a result of consolidating the Industrial Research Promotion Fund (FFF), the Austrian Space Agency (ASA), the Bureau for International Research and Technology Cooperation (BIT), and the Technology Impulse Society (TiG) into one Agency. The Agency moved into the Haus der Forschung in late 2005.

The FFG is divided into four areas today (base programs, structural programs, thematic programs, as well as European and International Programs) and the Agency for Aerospace. A strategy department supports the FFG and relevant ministries in the development of research policies.

The offers of the Research Promotion Agency include funding for research projects of companies and researchers in Austria, advice on choosing the right programs and assisting in the submission to European programs and international cooperation projects for Austrian researchers. The Agency for Aerospace helps to represent the interests of Austrian interests at the European Space Agency (ESA).

Through its activities FFG has broad access to information on research projects and research collaborations and information on technological trends at European level.

Services of FFG have a focus in supporting economically relevant research, however in some programs (such as BRIDGE) it also funds strategic research projects. For the funding of basic research projects its sister organization Austrian Science Fund (FWF) is mainly responsible.

Funding

The priorities of the FFG are divided into the following areas

 Basic programs - funding of bottom-up strategic projects
 Structural programs - structural funding (such as the program COMET )
 Thematic programs - top-down funding as a control element of politics
 European and international programs
 Austrian Space Program

The Austrian Research Promotion Agency promotes a yearly event called the "Austrian Champions in European Research", to award Austrian coordinators of European research projects.

See also 
 Austrian Space Agency

References

External links
 The Austrian Research Promotion Agency (FFG) (English version)

Government of Austria
Science and technology in Austria
2004 establishments in Austria
Government agencies established in 2004